Intestinal neoplasms can refer to:
 Small intestine cancer
 Colorectal cancer